Aamir Yousaf is a Pakistani TV director, producer, writer and former actor. Yousaf has directed drama serials such as  Virasat, Ghaao, Anokha Ladla and Aap ki Kaneez, for which he was nominated for Best TV Director at the 15th Lux Style Awards .

Filmography

Television
 Zindaan (director/producer) (PTV)
Anokha Ladla  ( PTV)
Main Mar Gai Shaukat Ali (A-Plus TV)
Mei Muhabat Aur Tum (A-Plus TV)
Ghao (GEO)
Virasat (GEO)
Aas (GEO)
Aap Ki Kaneez (GEO)
Paras (GEO)
Bas Vey Rabba  (director/producer) ( PTV)
Atiraz  (ARY)
Jaan Nisaar (A-Plus TV)
Is Chand Pe Dagh Nahin (A-Plus TV)
Ishq Mein Kaafir  (A-Plus TV)
Janbaaz (Express Entertainment)

Telefilms 

 Capt. Bilal Shaheed (ISPR)
 Ehd-e-Wafa (ISPR)
 Dosti (ISPR)

Accolades

References

External links
Amir Yousuf at BlackPixelProductions

Pakistani television producers
Pakistani television writers
Pakistani male television actors
Year of birth missing (living people)
People from Karachi
Male television writers
Living people
Pakistani television directors